Willy Derboven (Leuven, 19 September 1939 — Tenerife, Spain, 22 November 1996) was a Belgian professional road bicycle racer. In 1963, Derboven was the lanterne rouge of the 1963 Tour de France. In 1964, he beat German Rudi Altig in the fifth stage of the 1964 Tour de France.

Major results

1960
Berlare
Romsée-Stavelot-Romsée
Hoegaarden
1962
Onze-Lieve-Vrouw-Tielt
1964
Tour de France:
Winner stage 5
1966
Geetbets
Liedekerke
Scherpenheuvel
Tessenderlo
1967
Nieuwkerken-Waas
1968
Hoogstraten

External links 

Official Tour de France results for Willy Derboven

1939 births
1996 deaths
Sportspeople from Leuven
Cyclists from Flemish Brabant
Belgian male cyclists
Belgian Tour de France stage winners